Mackem, Makem or Mak'em is a nickname for residents of and people from Sunderland, a city in North East England. It is also a name for the local dialect and accent (not to be confused with Geordie); and for a fan, of whatever origin, of Sunderland A.F.C. It has been used by (a proportion of) the people of Sunderland to describe themselves since the 1980s, prior to which it was mainly used in Tyneside as a disparaging exonym.  Prior to the 1980s, the people of Sunderland were known as Geordies, in common with people from Tyneside.  An alternative name for a Mackem (except in the sense of a football supporter) is a Wearsider.

According to the British Library, "Locals insist there are significant differences between Geordie [spoken in Newcastle upon Tyne] and several other local dialects, such as Pitmatic and Mackem. Pitmatic is the dialect of the former mining areas in County Durham and around Ashington to the north of Newcastle upon Tyne, while Mackem is used locally to refer to the dialect of the city of Sunderland and the surrounding urban area of Wearside."

Etymology
There is much debate about the origin of the word Mackem, although it has been argued that it may stem from the phrase "Mak ‘em and Tak’em" - with Mak’em being the local pronunciation of "make them" and Tak’em from "take them".

According to the current entry in the Oxford English Dictionary, the earliest occurrence of the word Mackem or Mak’em in print was in 1988. However, as evidenced by the attached news articles, the word Mak’em (or Mackem) has been much in evidence for a great many years prior to 1988. Indeed, one of the articles attached dates to 1929.

It has been argued that the expressions date back to the height of Sunderland's shipbuilding history, as the shipwrights would make the ships, then the maritime pilots and tugboat captains would take them down the River Wear to the sea – the shipyards and port authority being the most conspicuous employers in Sunderland. A variant explanation is that the builders at Sunderland would build the ships, which would then go to Tyneside to be outfitted, hence from the standpoint of someone from Sunderland, "we make 'em an' they take 'em" – however, this account is disputed (and, indeed, as an earlier form of the name was Mac n' Tac, it seems unlikely). Another explanation is that ships were both built and repaired (i.e. "taken in for repairs") on the Wear. The term could also be a reference to the volume of ships built during wartime on the River Wear, e.g. "We make'em and they sink'em".

Whatever the exact origin of the term, Mackem has come to refer to someone from Sunderland and its surrounding areas, in particular the supporters of the local football team Sunderland AFC, and may have been coined in that context. Newcastle and Sunderland have a history of rivalry beyond the football pitch, the rivalry associated with industrial disputes of the 19th century.

Evidence suggests the term is a recent coinage. According to the Oxford English Dictionary, the earliest occurrence of it in print was in 1988. The phrase "we still tak'em and mak'em" was found in a sporting context in 1973 in reference to Sunderland Cricket & Rugby Football Club. While this lends support to the theory that this phrase was the origin of the term "Mak'em", there is nothing to suggest that "mak'em" had come to be applied to people from Sunderland generally at such a date. The name "Mak'em" may refer to the Wearside shipyard workers, who during World War II were brought into shipbuilding and regarded as taking work away from the Geordies on Tyneside.

Characteristics
There has been very little academic work done on the Sunderland dialect.  It was a site in the early research by Alexander John Ellis, who also recorded a local song called Spottee.  Ellis considered Sunderland as speaking a variant of the North Durham dialect, part of the ‘North Northern’ dialect group that also covers Northumberland and the northernmost part of Cumberland around Carlisle. Ellis also noted the influence on Sunderland speech from migrants to the area from Ireland and Scotland. 

In the Survey of English Dialects, the nearby town of Washington was surveyed.  The researcher of the site, Stanley Ellis, later worked with police on analysing the speech in a tape sent to the police during the Yorkshire Ripper investigation, which became known as the Wearside Jack tape because the police switched their investigation to Wearside after Ellis's analysis of the tape.

To people outside the region, the differences between Mackem and Geordie dialects often seem marginal, but there are many notable differences. A perceptual dialect study by the University of Sunderland found that locals of the region consider Geordie and Mackem to be separate dialects and identify numerous lexical, grammatical, and phonetic differences between the two. In fact, Mackem is considered to be more closely related to County Durham Pitmatic than to Geordie, with both dialects collectively forming the Central Urban North-Eastern English dialect region. There are even a small but noticeable differences in pronunciation and grammar between the dialects of North and South Sunderland (for example, the word something in North Sunderland is often summik whereas a South Sunderland speaker may often prefer summat and people from the surrounding areas prefer summit).

Phonology

 Make and take are pronounced mak and tak ( and ) in the most conservative forms of the dialect. This variation is the supposed reason why Tyneside shipyard workers might have coined "Mak'em" as an insult. However, the pronunciation of the word is not confined to Sunderland and can be found in other areas of Northern England and Scotland.
 Many words ending in -own are pronounced .
 School is split into two syllables, with a short  in between, .
This feature has led to some words being very differently pronounced in Sunderland. The word face, due to the inclusion of an extra  and the contraction thereof, is often pronounced . While  and some other cases of this extra vowel have been observed in the Geordie dialect, 
 The  vowel pronounced  as in Received Pronunciation, unlike the rhotic Scots variant. Cf. Geordie .
 Most words that have the  vowel are pronounced with a short  such as after, laughter, pasta. However, in the same way as the Geordie dialect, the words plaster and master are often pronounced with a long . This is not found in most northern accents apart from in the North East.
 The Mackem accent is different from Geordie in some instances. For example, the pronunciation of curry is often more like cerry. As well as this the use of oo <u:> in words with the BROWN vowel isn't as frequent as it is in the Geordie accent (Sunderland=town v Newcastle=toon), however, this feature was traditionally found in all dialects north of the Humber-Lune Line. 
In words such as green and cheese it has been said that the Sunderland accent has more of a  diphthong instead of the standard  vowel in most dialects of English.
 H-dropping in words such as him, her, half is said to be a feature in Sunderland, Butterknowle, Hartlepool and Middlesbrough, but not in other areas of the North East.
  is traditionally clear in all contexts, meaning the velarised allophone is absent.

Grammar

Definite Article
Unlike some Northern English varieties the definite article is never reduced. As in Scots and other Northumbrian dialects the definite article is used in a wider range of contexts than in standard English, including kinship terms, names of institutions, temporal expressions, illnesses, and even numbers.

Indefinite Article
The indefinite article is used with one in certain contexts.

Modal Verbs
Modals can and will as well as the verb de (do) have uncontracted negative forms.

The use of dinnet contrasts with Geordie divvent.

Pronouns

Vocabulary
aight - eight
alang - along
alarn - alone
an arl - as well, also (compare Scots an aw)
an't - aren't
aye - yes
beut - boot
blar - blow
canny - good or a lot
card - cold 
clarts - mud
clip - slap; in a poor state
clivver - clever 
clout - hit
dinnar - dunno
diz - does
dizn't - doesn't
fower - four
fyace, pyat - face
gan - go
garn - going (gannin is favoured in surrounding colliery towns)
gie's - give me
git - very
grar - grow 
knar - know
lang - long
leet - light
mair - more
mak - make
marra - friend, acquiantance
nak - hurt
neet - night
neen - none
nivver - never
nor, nee - no
owld - old 
pund - pound
reet - right
rund - round
snar - snow
spelk - splinter 
spuggy - sparrow 
tak - take
te - to
telt - told 
the neet - tonight
the morra - tomorrow
tret - treated 
wad - would
waddent - wouldn’t 
watter - water
wesh - wash
wey - well (wey nar = well no)
whe - who
whese - whose
wrang - wrong
yem - home
yisterda - yesterday

See also
 Monkey hanger
 Smoggie
 Sandancer

References

Bibliography

External links 

 Mackems Virtual Sunderland
 Wear Online – Home of the Mackem Dictionary

City of Sunderland
British regional nicknames
People from Tyne and Wear
Culture in Tyne and Wear
Languages of the United Kingdom
English language in England